The St. Louis Bridge is a Canadian traffic bridge (and former railway bridge) that spans the South Saskatchewan River in St. Louis, Saskatchewan. It crosses the river from St. Louis into the Rural Municipality of Prince Albert No. 461.
 
The bridge was built by the Grand Trunk Pacific Railway opening to rail traffic in 1915.  In March 1928 work was completed on the attachment of two roadways onto the bridge, opening to traffic on May 9, 1928. The bridge continued to support the Canadian National Railway use until 1983 when the rail line was abandoned.  The bridge was subsequently modified to carry road traffic on the former rail bed.

Construction of a new bridge to carry Highway 2 over the river was undertaken in the early 2010s 1.6 km east of the old bridge. It is possible that the old bridge will be demolished after the new one is completed. The new bridge was completed in the fall of 2014 at a cost of $30 million.

See also 
 List of crossings of the South Saskatchewan River
 List of bridges in Canada
 List of road-rail bridges

References 

Canadian National Railway bridges in Canada
Railway bridges in Saskatchewan
Bridges completed in 1915
Bridges over the South Saskatchewan River
Prince Albert No. 461, Saskatchewan
Road bridges in Saskatchewan
Former railway bridges in Canada
Steel bridges in the United States
Steel bridges in Canada